Aspidodiadema nicobaricum is a species of sea urchin of the family Aspidodiadematidae. Their armour is covered with spines. It is placed in the genus Aspidodiadema and lives in the sea. Aspidodiadema nicobaricum was first scientifically described in 1901 by Döderlein.

See also 
 Aspidodiadema meijerei
 Aspidodiadema montanum
 Aspidodiadema sinuosum

References 

nicobaricum
Animals described in 1901